The Mosque of Omar Ibn al-Khattab is a historic mosque in Dumat al-Jandal in northern Saudi Arabia, located adjacent to the Marid Castle. It is
one of the oldest mosques in the north of the Arabian Peninsula and is considered one of the important monuments in Al-Jawf and in Saudi Arabia in general.

The mosque's architecture represents continuity of the pattern of the design of the first mosques, in particular the design of Prophet’s Mosque in Medina in its early stages.

Founding 
The mosque is attributed to the caliph Omar al-Farooq, it is said that it was built by him in the year 16 AH while he was heading to Jerusalem.

Location 
Omar Bin Al-Khattab Mosque is located in the center of the ancient town of Dumat Al-Jandal, next to the Marid Castle, adjacent to the Aldara’a neighborhood from the southern side. The town belongs to the Al-Jouf region in the north of Saudi Arabia.

Design 
The importance of the Mosque of Omar Ibn al-Khattab is in its design because it represents a continuation of the pattern of the first mosque design in Islam. It is reminiscent of the design of the Prophet Mosque in Medina in its early stages. The mosque consists of the corridor of the qiblah, the mihrab, the minbar, the courtyard of the mosque and the prayer area. The back of the mosque is a sanctum for prayer in the winter during the intense cold. The backpacker Wallin who visited the area more than 163 years ago stated: "The Saudi princes in the first Saudi state rebuilt the mosque on The same location”, and saying about the minaret during his visit to the region in 1261 AH: “It is the only minaret in the old Domat Al-Jandal." It was covered with the stems of palm trees. It is said that Omar ordered the construction of the mosque, and then after that it was renewed with some additions.

The minaret
The mosque is known for its  minaret in the southwest corner that deviates from the level of the qibla wall. It is the first minaret built in the Islamic era. It is divided into four floors, with windows on each floor, and is built on the roof of the corridor leading to the external road. Entry to the minaret was previously through climbing to the ceiling of the mosque and then to the first floor of it. The upper floors were connected to each other by a stone staircase; some parts of it have collapsed, making the minaret inaccessible today. The Finnish backpacker has mentioned that the mosque’s market is where the Friday prayer sermon is delivered.

Restoration 
The restoration processes included all parts of the mosque, such as rebuilding the destroyed walls, restoring the entire roof, cleaning the floors and paving it with stones, filling the spaces between the stones, restoring the mosque's sanctum and repairing its doors.

Gallery

References 
1.^ Al-Watan Newspaper: Dumat Al-Jandal is the first minaret in Islam. ArchivedJanuary 19, 2015, on the Wayback Machine .

2.^ Al-Jawf, Hussain Ali Al-Khalifa, Nawaf Dhabban Al-Rashed, Al-Jouf Wing, Janadriya 18, p. 5.

3.^ Al Youm: Al - Jouf Mosque of Omar Ibn al - Khattab saved version January 19, 2015 onsite Wai Pak disgraceful .

4.^ Al-Jawf Land of Antiquities and Civilization, Turki bin Ibrahim Algahadan, 1425, p85.

5.^ In the northwest of the Peninsula, Hamad Al-Jasser, 1st edition, Al-Yamamah Publications for Research, Translation and Publishing,

Riyadh, 1390 AH / 1970 AD, pp. 150–151.

7.^”Cultural / Omar Bin Al-Khattab Mosque, one of the most important historical mosques in the Kingdom, Saudi News Agency" . www.spa.gov.sa . Archived from the original on October 13, 2019 . View it on 8 July 2019

8. ^ Bilad al-Jawf or Dumat al-Jandal, Geographical, Historical, Social, and Literary Research, Saad bin Abdullah bin Junaidl, 1st edition, Dar Al Yamamah Publications for Research, Translation and Publishing, Riyadh, 1401 AH / 1981AD, p. 110.

9. ^ Antiquities of Al-Jouf Region, Hussain Bin Ali Al-Khalifa and Others, Antiquities and Museums Agency, Riyadh, 1423 AH / 2003AD, p. 114.

Mosques in Saudi Arabia